The following is the results of the Qods League's 1989–90 Iranian football season.

Group stage

Group A

Group B

Knockout stage

Semifinals

|}

Leg 1

Leg 2

Final

Final standings

Top goalscorers
 16 goals
  Mohammad Ahmadzadeh (Malavan)

 13 goals
  Samad Marfavi (Esteghlal)

 11 goals
  Ali Firozi (Sanat Naft)

 10 goals
  Morteza Yeke (Esteghlal)

See also
 Pars Sport

Iraq
1989–90 in Iranian football